Adam Raška (born 25 September 2001) is a Czech professional ice hockey player for the San Jose Barracuda of the American Hockey League (AHL), as a prospect to the San Jose Sharks of the National Hockey League (NHL).

Playing career
Raška was drafted by the San Jose Sharks in the 2020 NHL Entry Draft. He signed an entry level contract with the Sharks on 12 May 2021 and made his NHL debut on 11 January 2022, in a 3–2 win over the Detroit Red Wings.

Career statistics

Regular season and playoffs

International

References

External links

2001 births
Living people
Czech expatriate ice hockey people
Czech expatriate ice hockey players in Canada
Czech expatriate ice hockey players in the United States
Czech ice hockey right wingers
HC Frýdek-Místek players
HC Oceláři Třinec players
People from Kopřivnice
Rimouski Océanic players
San Jose Barracuda players
San Jose Sharks draft picks
San Jose Sharks players
Sportspeople from the Moravian-Silesian Region